The Year of "Yes" is the reissue of South Korean girl group Twice's sixth EP Yes or Yes. It was released by JYP Entertainment on December 12, 2018. The reissue contains the initial seven tracks from Yes or Yes, along with two new songs: "The Best Thing I Ever Did" and the Korean version of "Be As One" from the group's Japanese album BDZ.

Background and release 
Twice first announced the release of an upcoming special album on December 3, 2018, revealing its title to be The Year of "Yes" along with its title track "The Best Thing I Ever Did", slated to be released on December 12. Group photo teasers for the special album were uploaded on social media accounts on the same day. Individual teaser photos featuring Nayeon, Jeongyeon, and Momo were uploaded on December 4, along with the track list for The Year of "Yes", revealing that J.Y.Park and Park Ji-min had collaborated to write and compose the album's title track. It was also announced that the album would include the Korean version of "Be As One" from Twice's previously released album BDZ. On December 5, the group unveiled individual teaser photos featuring Sana, Jihyo, and Mina. On December 6, the last set of individual teaser photos featuring Dahyun, Chaeyoung, and Tzuyu were released. Additional group teaser photos were uploaded on December 7.

On December 8, Twice uploaded their first music video teaser for "The Best Thing I Ever Did". A second teaser was uploaded on the following day An audio preview for the album's title track was released by the group on December 10. An album medley which featured snippets for both "The Best Thing I Ever Did" and "Be As One" (Korean ver.) was uploaded on December 11.

The Year of "Yes" alongside its title track was officially released on December 12, 6PM KST.

Composition 
The Year of "Yes" contains two new tracks. The title track "The Best Thing I Ever Did" was written and composed by J.Y.Park and Park Ji-min, and was classified as an alternative R&B song which mixes Twice's distinctive pop sound to create a "warm winter sensibility." The holiday-inspired track lyrically describes the memory of meeting a loved one during the holiday season. The song was noted to be Twice's first instance of featuring the R&B genre. The second song, "Be As One", is a Korean version of their Japanese track from BDZ, and is classified as a ballad song.

Commercial performance 
The Year of "Yes" debuted at number 2 on the Weekly Gaon Album Chart. It became the third best-selling album on Gaon for the month of December, selling a total of 196,034 copies. With this, the album ranked at number 23 on the year-ender Gaon Album Chart for 2018.

Track listing

Charts

Weekly charts

Year-end charts

Certifications

References 

2018 EPs
Twice (group) EPs
JYP Entertainment EPs
Korean-language EPs
Reissue albums